Abdullah Hel Baki (born 1 August 1989) is a Bangladeshi sports shooter. He competed in the men's 10 metre air rifle event at the 2016 Summer Olympics. Prior to the Olympic games he also won a silver medal at the 2014 Commonwealth Games. He also won a bronze medal during the 2010 Commonwealth Games.

Abdullah Hel Baki was also the flag bearer for Bangladesh at the 2018 Commonwealth Games during the opening ceremony of the 2018 Commonwealth Games Parade of Nations. He also claimed the nation's first medal at the 2018 Commonwealth Games after clinching a silver medal in the men's 10 metre air rifle event.

References

External links
 
 

1989 births
Living people
Bangladeshi male sport shooters
Olympic shooters of Bangladesh
Shooters at the 2016 Summer Olympics
Place of birth missing (living people)
Commonwealth Games medallists in shooting
Commonwealth Games silver medallists for Bangladesh
Commonwealth Games bronze medallists for Bangladesh
Shooters at the 2010 Commonwealth Games
Shooters at the 2014 Commonwealth Games
Shooters at the 2018 Commonwealth Games
Shooters at the 2010 Asian Games
Shooters at the 2014 Asian Games
Shooters at the 2018 Asian Games
Asian Games competitors for Bangladesh
Shooters at the 2020 Summer Olympics
Medallists at the 2010 Commonwealth Games
Medallists at the 2018 Commonwealth Games